This is a list of members of the Riksdag, the national parliament of Sweden. The Riksdag is a unicameral assembly with 349 members of parliament, who are elected on a proportional basis to serve fixed terms of four years. In the Riksdag, members are seated per constituency and not party. The following MPs were elected in the 1994 Swedish general election.

Invalda parliamentarians

Replacements

Notes

1994 in Sweden
1995 in Sweden
1996 in Sweden
1997 in Sweden
1998 in Sweden
1994-1998
List